The word count is the number of words in a document or passage of text. Word counting may be needed when a text is required to stay within certain numbers of words. This may particularly be the case in academia, legal proceedings, journalism and advertising. Word count is commonly used by translators to determine the price of a translation job. Word counts may also be used to calculate measures of readability and to measure typing and reading speeds (usually in words per minute). When converting character counts to words, a measure of 5 or 6 characters to a word is generally used for English.

Details and variations of definition 

Variations in the operational definitions of how to count the words can occur (namely, what "counts as" a word, and which words "don't count" toward the total). However, especially since the advent of widespread word processing, there is a broad consensus on these operational definitions (and hence the bottom-line integer result). The consensus is to accept the text segmentation rules generally found in most word processing software (including how word boundaries are determined, which depends on how word dividers are defined). The first trait of that definition is that a space (any of various whitespace characters, such as a "regular" word space, an em space, or a tab character) is a word divider. Usually a hyphen or a slash is, too. Different word counting programs may give varying results, depending on the text segmentation rule details, and on whether words outside the main text (such as footnotes, endnotes, or hidden text) are counted. But the behavior of most major word processing applications is broadly similar.

However, during the era when school assignments were done in handwriting or with typewriters, the rules for these definitions often differed from today's consensus. Most importantly, many students were drilled on the rule that "certain words don't count", usually articles (namely, "a", "an", "the"), but sometimes also others, such as conjunctions (for example, "and", "or", "but") and some prepositions (usually "to", "of"). Hyphenated permanent compounds such as "follow-up" (noun) or "long-term" (adjective) were counted as one word. To save the time and effort of counting word-by-word, often a rule of thumb for the average number of words per line was used, such as 10 words per line. These "rules" have fallen by the wayside in the word processing era; the "word count" feature of such software (which follows the text segmentation rules mentioned earlier) is now the standard arbiter, because it is largely consistent (across documents and applications) and because it is fast, effortless, and costless (already included with the application).

As for which sections of a document "count" toward the total (such as footnotes, endnotes, abstracts, reference lists and bibliographies, tables, figure captions, hidden text), the person in charge (teacher, client) can define their choice, and users (students, workers) can simply select (or exclude) the elements accordingly, and watch the word count automatically update.

Software 
Modern web browsers support word counting via extensions, via a JavaScript bookmarklet, or a script that is hosted in a website. Most word processors can also count words. Unix-like systems include a  program, wc, specifically for word counting. There are a wide variety of word counting tools available online.
Different word counting programs may give varying results, depending on the text segmentation rule details. The exact number of words often is not a strict requirement, thus the variation is acceptable.

In fiction 
Novelist Jane Smiley suggests that length is an important quality of the novel. However, novels can vary tremendously in length; Smiley lists novels as typically being between 100,000 and 175,000 words, while National Novel Writing Month requires its novels to be at least 50,000 words. There are no firm rules: for example, the boundary between a novella and a novel is arbitrary and a literary work may be difficult to categorise. But while the length of a novel is to a large extent up to its writer, lengths may also vary by subgenre; many chapter books for children start at a length of about 16,000 words, and a typical mystery novel might be in the 60,000 to 80,000 word range while a thriller could be well over 100,000 words.

The Science Fiction and Fantasy Writers of America specifies word lengths for each category of its Nebula Award categories:

In non-fiction 
The acceptable length of an academic dissertation varies greatly, dependent predominantly on the subject. Numerous American universities limit Ph.D. dissertations to 100,000 words, barring special permission for exceeding this limit.

See also
Flash fiction
Twitterature
Word lists by frequency

References

Sources
.
. An article on various word count methods in fiction publishing.
 An article on the relative importance of various word count methods in fiction publishing.

Word processors
Book terminology
Writing